The New Granada Theater at 2007 Centre Avenue in the Hill District neighborhood of Pittsburgh, Pennsylvania, was built in 1927 and 1928.  This Art Deco theater was designed by architect Louis Arnett Stuart Bellinger, and originally was a Pythian Temple, a meeting place for the Knights of Pythias (a fraternal order and secret society).  In this case, it was a lodge for a group of African American construction workers known as the Knights of the Pythian.  In the 1930s, the building was sold to Harry Hendel, who moved two blocks from his old Granada Theater to this New Granada Theater.  The building was remodeled in 1937 and 1938 by Alfred M. Marks, and it became a movie theater as well as a place for live entertainment, music and dancing.  Jazz legends such as Duke Ellington, Ella Fitzgerald, Count Basie and Cab Calloway performed at this location.

It was added to the List of City of Pittsburgh historic designations on October 8, 2004, the List of Pittsburgh History and Landmarks Foundation Historic Landmarks in 2007, and the National Register of Historic Places on December 27, 2010.

References

External links
 Pittsburgh Music History -Profile of the Pythian Temple /New Granada Theater

African-American history in Pittsburgh
Theatres on the National Register of Historic Places in Pennsylvania
Theatres in Pittsburgh
Art Deco architecture in Pennsylvania
Theatres completed in 1928
City of Pittsburgh historic designations
Pittsburgh History & Landmarks Foundation Historic Landmarks
Historic American Buildings Survey in Pennsylvania
1928 establishments in Pennsylvania
National Register of Historic Places in Pittsburgh